Schützen am Gebirge is a municipality in the Eisenstadt-Umgebung district in the Austrian state of Burgenland.

History
The first written mention of Schützen am Gebirge was in 1211.

Name
Gebirge means 'mountain range'.  Schützen is a German plural noun for marksmen.  The verb schützen is not related to this noun, but to schutz, meaning 'to guard' or 'to protect'.

Population

References 

Cities and towns in Eisenstadt-Umgebung District